One Cure Fits All is the ninth full-length album by rock band Therapy?, and the third and final to be released on Spitfire Records. It was released on 24 April 2006. The album was recorded in January 2006 at Jacobs Studios in Surrey. The album was not released in North America, but charted at number 152 in the UK Albums Chart.

Produced by Pedro Ferreira (who also produced The Darkness album Permission to Land), the album features markedly polished production, similar to their major label years. This met with a mixed reaction upon its release by fans of the band. The material itself varies, with songs like "Walk through Darkness" and "Dopamine, Seratonin, Adrenaline" displaying anthemic tendencies, while the like of "Unconsoled" and "Private Nobody" are in keeping with the familiar themes of isolation and alienation.

The album was released on CD and download.

Track listing 
All songs written by Therapy?

Personnel 
Therapy?
Andy Cairns – vocals, guitar
Neil Cooper – drums
Michael McKeegan – bass
with:
Eduardo Rei – cowbell
Ian Gatford – voice on "Dopamine, Seratonin, Adrenaline"
Technical
Pedro Ferreira – producer, mixer and engineer
Sam Scott Hunter – photography
Curt Evans – design

Singles 
"Rain Hits Concrete" was a download only EP released on 10 April 2006 with "Crazy Cocaine Eyes", "Hard Work Hope" and "Play On".
"Freeze the Remains" was a download only track available from iTunes. It was also later released on a promo CD given away with Rock Sound magazine.

Charts

References 

2006 albums
Therapy? albums
Spitfire Records albums